Lesbian, gay, bisexual, and transgender (LGBT) persons in São Tomé and Príncipe face legal challenges not experienced by non-LGBT residents. Both male and female same-sex sexual activity is legal in São Tomé and Príncipe, however LGBT persons face stigmatization among the broader population.

São Tomé and Príncipe was one of the few African states that signed a "joint statement on ending acts of violence and related human rights violations based on sexual orientation and gender identity" at the United Nations, condemning violence and discrimination against LGBT people.

Laws regarding same-sex sexual activity 

Under the Penal Code of São Tomé and Príncipe that took effect in November 2012, same-sex sexual activity is legal. The age of consent is 16 years regardless of sexual orientation or gender.

Recognition of same-sex relationships 

São Tomé and Príncipe does not recognize same-sex marriages, civil unions, or domestic partnerships.

Discrimination protections 

There is no legal protection against discrimination based on sexual orientation or gender identity.

Public opinion
A 2016 poll found that 46% of Sāo Toméans would like or not mind having an LGBT neighbor.

Summary table

See also

Human rights in São Tomé and Príncipe
LGBT rights in Africa

References

São Tomé and Príncipe
Law of São Tomé and Príncipe
LGBT in São Tomé and Príncipe
Human rights in São Tomé and Príncipe